The St. Petersburg Kickers FC are an amateur American soccer team from St. Petersburg, Florida that compete in the Florida Suncoast Soccer League (FSSL). They are notable as the first team from Florida to win the U.S. Open Cup.

History
Founded by Kurt Herbach in 1957, the Kickers won their first national title, the Over-30 championship, in 1967. By 1989, the team had won eleven Florida Suncoast Soccer League championships and four Florida State Cups. The club's most prestigious victory came on the national stage winning the 1989 National Challenge Cup (now known as US Open Cup).

In 1997, the team moved to Land o' Lakes, Florida, eventually taking the name of Florida Kickers FC. That year the club won both the National Amateur Cup and the National Over-30 championship. In 2008, it won its third national amateur championship.

Honors
National Challenge Cup winners: 1 (1989)
National Amateur Cup winners: 3  (1990, 1997, 2008)
National Amateur Cup runners-up: 1 (2003)
Participations in CONCACAF Champions' Cup: 1990

Coaches
 Steve Gogas (1972-)
 Chris McMaster
 Wim Suurbier (1994)

Notable players
  Fred Armstrong
  Derek Backman
  Matt Clare
  Garth Pollonais
  Andrew Restrepo
  Joey Valenti
  Tanner Wolfe
  J.P. Reyes

References

External links
 Florida Suncoast Soccer League

Association football clubs established in 1957
1957 establishments in Florida
Soccer clubs in Florida
Sports in Tampa, Florida
Sports in St. Petersburg, Florida
Florida Tropics SC
U.S. clubs in CONCACAF Champions' Cup
U.S. Open Cup winners